Adil Shayakhmetuly Shayakhmetov (Ädıl Şaiahmetūly Şaiahmetov; born 20 January 1956) was the head of Kazakhstan's National Security Committee (NSC) from December 2009 to August 2010.

Personal life
Shayakhmetov was born in the village of Kaganovich in Zhambyl District, Almaty Province. He graduated from the Kazakh Polytechnic Institute named for V. I. Lenin (now Kazakh National Technical University) in 1978. He is married, and has a son and two daughters.

Career
Shayakhmetov began his intelligence career in the KGB's Jezkazgan branch in 1982. He was promoted from NSC deputy chairman to full chairman in December 2009 as a replacement for Amangeldy Shabdarbayev, who was removed from his post for unclear reasons. Shayakhmetov himself was removed from his post in August 2010 in the aftermath of the arrest of Prosecutor-General's Office official Murat Musabekov, who was fingered as allegedly plotting a coup in an anonymous letter allegedly circulated by NSC officers. He was replaced by Nursultan Nazarbaev loyalist and political heavyweight Nurtai Abykayev.

References

1956 births
Living people
Kazakhstani politicians
KGB officers
Directors of intelligence agencies